Loral Langemeier (born Loral L. Langemeier) is an American writer on finance. She has appeared on The Dr. Phil Show and other media outlets.

References 

21st-century American businesspeople
Living people
Year of birth missing (living people)